Eduard Anasovich Rakhmangulov (born 6 June 1966; died 29 July 1999 in an automobile accident) was a Russian professional football player.

Club career
He made his Russian Football National League debut for FC Neftekhimik Nizhnekamsk on 11 April 1993 in a game against FC Gazovik Izhevsk.

Honours
 Russian Second Division Zone 5 top scorer: 1992 (26 goals).

External links

References

1966 births
Road incident deaths in Russia
1999 deaths
Soviet footballers
Russian footballers
Association football forwards
Association football midfielders
PFC Krylia Sovetov Samara players
FC Neftyanik Ufa players
FC Neftekhimik Nizhnekamsk players
FC Zvezda Perm players